Kyongsong Chuul Airport is a military airport in Kyongsong-gun, Hamgyong-bukto, North Korea. It is subordinate to the 8th Air Transport Division and is home to an officer training school.

Google Earth imagery from 2018 shows the airport is undergoing complete reconstruction.

Facilities 
The airfield has a single asphalt runway 13/31 measuring 3500 x 200 feet (1067 x 61 m).

It is sited on the east coast of North Korea, a few miles north of the Orang Airport and south of the city of Chongjin.

References 

Airports in North Korea
North Hamgyong